Charles, Charlie or Chuck Robertson may refer to:

Academics
Charles Grant Robertson (1869–1948), British academic historian
Charles Victor Robertson (1882–1951), New Zealand - Australian businessman, politician and educator
Charles Martin Robertson (1911–2004), British classical scholar and poet

Public officials
Charles Robertson (UK politician) (1874-1968), Chair of London County Council
Charles Robertson (Norwegian politician) (1875–1958), Norwegian Minister of Trade, 1926–1928
Charles R. Robertson (1889–1951), U.S. Republican politician
Charlie Robertson (mayor) (1934–2017), American politician and mayor of York, Pennsylvania
Charles T. Robertson Jr. (born 1946), U.S. Air Force general

Sports
Charlie Robertson (1896–1984), American Major League Baseball pitcher
Charlie Robertson (footballer) (1873–1940), Australian rules footballer

Others
Charles Franklin Robertson (1835–1886), bishop of Missouri in the Episcopal Church
Charles Robertson (painter) (1844-1891), English painter and engraver
Charles Robertson (priest) (1873–1946), Anglican priest
Charles Graham Robertson (1879–1954), English recipient of the Victoria Cross
Charles Robertson (entomologist) (1858–1935), American entomologist
Charles John Robertson (1798-1830), English botanical illustrator
Chuck Robertson, lead singer of the ska punk band Mad Caddies

Characters
Charles Robertson (Green Wing)

See also
Robertson (surname)
Charles Young (cricketer) (Charles Robertson Young, 1852–1913), English cricketer
Robert Skene (polo player) (Charles Robertson Skene, 1914–1997), polo player
Charles Robertson Maier (born 1945), Priory Historian for St John Ambulance, The Priory of Canada
Charles Macleod-Robertson (1870–1951), British sailor